Vail is an unincorporated community in Thurston County, in the U.S. state of Washington. The community lies south of Rainier and accessibility to Washington State Route 507.

History
The community was named after  William Vail, the original owner of the town site. A post office was in operation at Vail from 1930 until 1963.

References

Unincorporated communities in Thurston County, Washington